Feimster House was a historic home located near Statesville, Iredell County, North Carolina.  It was built about 1800, and is a -story, three bay by two bay, frame transitional Georgian / Federal style dwelling.  It had a steeply pitched gable roof and rested on a high fieldstone foundation. It has been demolished.

It was added to the National Register of Historic Places in 1982.

References

Houses on the National Register of Historic Places in North Carolina
Georgian architecture in North Carolina
Federal architecture in North Carolina
Houses completed in 1800
Houses in Iredell County, North Carolina
National Register of Historic Places in Iredell County, North Carolina